Serge Robichaud is a Canadian politician, who was elected to the Legislative Assembly of New Brunswick in the 2010 provincial election. He represented the electoral district of Miramichi Bay-Neguac as a member of the Progressive Conservatives until the 2014 election, when he was defeated by Lisa Harris.

References

Progressive Conservative Party of New Brunswick MLAs
Acadian people
Living people
21st-century Canadian politicians
Year of birth missing (living people)